Maximilien de Wignacourt, alternatively Vignacourt or Vignacurtius (1560–1620) was a writer in Latin and French in the Spanish Netherlands.

Life
Wignacourt was born in Arras in 1560, a nephew of the renowned jurist François Baudouin. In the late 1570s he studied at the University of Leuven under Justus Lipsius, to whom he wrote a letter (now in Leiden University Library) on 9 November 1586. In 1582 he entered the service of Bernardino de Mendoza in England, and on his recommendation seems to have become a hanger-on at the court of Philip II of Spain. His poems of commemoration and congratulation for powerful figures provided a meagre income. By 1602 he was attached to the court in Brussels. He died in Leuven on 21 November 1620.

Works
Sereniss. Parmae et Placentiae ducis nominis anagrammatismus (n.p.d. [1586])
Discours sur l'estat des Pays Bas, auquel sont déduictes les causes de ses troubles et calamitez et leurs remèdes (Arras, Guillaume de la Riviere, 1593). Available on Google Books.
Serenissimi Ernesti adventum gratulatur Belgicae Maxaemyliani V (Brussels, Jan Mommaert, 1594).
In res Belgicas deinosis (Antwerp, Andreas Bax, 1596). Available online.
Antistitis praecellentis euphemia (Arras, Robert Maudhuy, 1605). Congratulatory verses on the occasion of Nicolas Mainfroy's enthronement as abbot of Saint-Bertin.
Preliminary verses included in Estienne Ydens, Histoire du S. sacrement du miracle reposant à Bruxelles (Brussels, Rutger Velpius, 1605). Available online.
Pro eutrapelia seriis interposita per Isabellam Claram Eugeniam, regiam ex Hispania progeniem, archiducem Austriae, principem ditionum Belgicae Inferioris apologia (Leuven, Gerard Rivius, 1615)

References

1560 births
1620 deaths
People from Arras
New Latin-language poets
Old University of Leuven alumni
Flemish nobility